Walter Joshua "Jay" Eldredge Jr. (27 April 1913 – 27 April 2002) was the thirteenth general superintendent of the Young Men's Mutual Improvement Association of the Church of Jesus Christ of Latter-day Saints (LDS Church) from 1969 to 1972.

Biography
In 1969, he succeeded G. Carlos Smith as the leader of the YMMIA. In November 1972, Eldredge became the first general superintendent of that organization to be called the general president of the YMMIA. Just weeks after this change in terminology, Eldredge was released and was succeeded by his second counselor, Robert L. Backman.

Prior to his service in the YMMIA, Eldredge had been a church mission president in the eastern United States and was the first president of the Parley's Stake of the church.

Eldredge was born in Salt Lake City, Utah, to Walter Joshua and Lutie S. Nicholson Eldredge. He married Marjory Ormsby Hyde, a great-granddaughter of LDS Church apostle Orson Hyde. Together they had five children. He died in Salt Lake City on his 89th birthday.

See also
George I. Cannon
George R. Hill

References
Arnold K. Garr, Donald Q. Cannon & Richard O. Cowan (eds.) (2000). Encyclopedia of Latter-day Saint History (Salt Lake City, Utah: Deseret Book)

External links
 Jay Eldredge obituary

1913 births
2002 deaths
20th-century Mormon missionaries
American Mormon missionaries in the United States
American leaders of the Church of Jesus Christ of Latter-day Saints
General Presidents of the Young Men (organization)
Latter Day Saints from Utah
Mission presidents (LDS Church)
People from Salt Lake City